Robert Fico's Second Cabinet is the former government of Slovakia, headed by prime minister Robert Fico. Appointed on 4 April 2012, it consists of 14 members, 11 from the Direction - Social Democracy party and three independents. It replaced Iveta Radicova's cabinet after gaining an absolute majority in the Slovak parliament following the 2012 Slovak parliamentary election.

This was the first time since the breakup of Czechoslovakia that any party had won an absolute majority, though Smer-SD fell seven seats short of a three-fifths majority to unilaterally amend the constitution.

Fico's Second Cabinet was replaced by Fico's Third Cabinet on 23 March 2016.

Composition
Following the 2012 Slovak parliamentary election, the current prime minister, Robert Fico is serving with his government since 4 April 2012.

See also 
Fico's First Cabinet

References

External links
 Official website (in Slovak)

Government of Slovakia
2012 establishments in Slovakia
Cabinets established in 2012
Direction – Social Democracy
Slovak government cabinets